Khor Al Zubair is a city in Basra, in Iraq. As well as the Khor Al Zubair Port, it is also has major industrial areas which are home to laboratories and companies that include petrochemical companies and fertilizer plants. To the south there are iron and steel plants, as well as those producing various liquids and gases.

References 

 

Khor Al Zubair
Populated places in Basra Province
Port cities and towns of the Persian Gulf